Timbisha (Tümpisa) or Panamint (also called Koso) is the language of the Native American people who have inhabited the region in and around Death Valley, California, and the southern Owens Valley since late prehistoric times. There are a few elderly individuals who can speak the language in California and Nevada, but none is monolingual, and all use English regularly in their daily lives. Until the late 20th century, the people called themselves and their language "Shoshone." The tribe then achieved federal recognition under the name Death Valley Timbisha Shoshone Band of California. This is an Anglicized spelling of the native name of Death Valley, tümpisa, pronounced , which means "rock paint" and refers to the rich sources of red ochre in the valley. Timbisha is also the language of the so-called "Shoshone" groups at Bishop, Big Pine, Darwin, Independence, and Lone Pine communities in California and the Beatty community in Nevada. It was also the language spoken at the former Indian Ranch reservation in Panamint Valley.

Classification
Timbisha is one of the Central Numic languages of the Numic branch of Uto-Aztecan. It is most closely related to Shoshoni and Comanche.

Geographic distribution
Timbisha was formerly spoken in the region between the Sierra Nevada mountains of eastern California and the region just to the east of Death Valley in Nevada. Principal valleys where villages were located were (from west to east) Owens Valley, Indian Wells Valley, Saline Valley, Panamint Valley, and Death Valley. In addition, there were villages along the southern slopes of the Kawich Range in Nevada.

Dialects
Each valley had its own variety of Timbisha with mostly lexical differences between them. McLaughlin's grammar is based on the far eastern variety from Beatty, Nevada, while Dayley's is based on a central variety from Death Valley.

Phonology

Vowels
Timbisha also has a typical Numic vowel inventory of five vowels. (The official orthography is shown in parentheses.)

Consonants
Timbisha has a typical Numic  consonant  inventory.  (The official orthography is shown in parentheses.):

Phonotactics
Timbisha stops (including the affricate) and nasals are voiced and lenited between vowels, are voiced in nasal-stop clusters, and are lenited (but not voiced) following .

Voiceless vowels are less common in Timbisha than in Shoshoni and Comanche.

Writing system

Grammar
Study of Timbisha has been carried on by Jon Dayley and John McLaughlin, both of whom wrote grammatical descriptions. Dayley has published a dictionary.

Word order and case marking
Timbisha word order is usually SOV as in:

The accusative case and possessive case are marked with suffixes. Adverbial relationships are marked with postpositions on nouns as well as with true adverbs. For example:

Adjectives are usually prefixed to the nouns they modify, unless the relationship is temporary when they are independent words with special suffixes. Compare tosa-kapayu, 'white-horse', "palomino or other pale-colored breed" and tosapihtü kapayu, 'white/pale horse', "white or pale horse" (who happens to be white or pale, but whose siblings may be any color).

Verbs
Verbs are marked for grammatical aspect with suffixes. Valence is marked with both prefixes and suffixes. Some common intransitive verbs have suppletive forms for singular or plural subjects and some common transitive verbs have suppletive forms for singular or plural objects. Otherwise, there is no grammatical agreement marked by the verb.

References

External links
 Panamint language overview at the Survey of California and Other Indian Languages
 Linguist List map of Panamint
 How to count in Timbisha
 OLAC resources in and about the Panamint language

Timbisha
Agglutinative languages
Numic languages
Indigenous languages of California
Indigenous languages of the Southwestern United States
Indigenous languages of the North American Southwest
Indigenous languages of the North American Great Basin
Subject–object–verb languages